Germán Glessner (born 8 March 1974 in Buenos Aires) is an Argentine/German Olympian who represented Argentina in the Winter Olympic Games of Salt Lake City 2002, in the ice sport of Skeleton.
Glessner is a multilingual businessman who speaks Spanish, English, German, Italian, and French, and shares his sports and business experiences as a keynote motivational speaker around the world.
He holds a bachelor's degree in International Business.

Business 
He is the founder and CEO of Glessner Group.

The company started in 2005 as an Architectural Visualizations Company, one of the top 5 CGI International Studios.
Glessner Group has gained international acclaim by being featured in numerous well-known architectural publications.

Glessner Group has participated in projects in Canada, USA, Greenland, Mexico, Panama, Costa Rica, Cuba, Dominican Republic, Uruguay, Brazil, Argentina, Colombia, Spain, UK, Denmark, Sweden, Norway, Germany, Austria, Switzerland, France, Slovakia, Czech Republic, Albania, Cyprus, Greece, Singapore, Malaysia, Taiwan, China, Azerbaijan, South Korea, Japan, Mongolia, Abu Dhabi, Dubai, Oman, and Cameroon. Collaborating with distinguished professionals like Arch. Oscar Niemeyer, Arch, Bjarke Ingels (founding partner at BIG Architects), and Michel Rojkind.

Nowadays Glessner Group is a Mergers & Acquisitions Boutique, with an international UHNWI network, involved in a wide field of industries and services such as real estate, and venture capitals, operating worldwide with a portfolio of over 20Bn dollars in Real Estate Assets.

Sports 
Glessner competed in Skeleton sport from 1996 to 2006, representing Argentina in the Winter Olympic Games of Salt Lake City 2002. Since 2015 he is the president of the Argentine Bobsleigh, Skeleton and Luge Association (AABSL). The AABSL was re-founded in 1996 by Christian Atance, Claudio Atance and German Glessner.
Founding member of the "Argentine Olympic Athletes Association".

Glessner worked as a computer programmer while training for skeleton in Innsbruck and Lake Placid, New York.

References

External links
 2002 men's skeleton results
 ESPN.com story on Glessner during the 2002 Winter Olympics
 Skeletonsport.com profile
 Athlete of the Year 2002 Worldwide
 Clarin, Argentina
 ESPN.com

1974 births
Living people
Argentine male skeleton racers
Olympic skeleton racers of Argentina
Skeleton racers at the 2002 Winter Olympics
Argentine people of German descent